
The Reid ministry was the 28th ministry of the Colony of New South Wales, and was led by the 12th Premier, George Reid. The title of Premier was widely used to refer to the Leader of Government, but was not a formal position in the government until 1920. Instead the Premier was appointed to another portfolio, usually Colonial Secretary but on this occasion Reid took the portfolio of Colonial Treasurer until July 1899 and then Attorney General.

Reid was elected to the New South Wales Legislative Assembly in 1880, serving until 1884 when he was defeated in a ministerial by-election. Reid was re-elected to the Assembly at the 1885 election and joined the Free Trade Party on its formation in 1887. He was one of four free traders who were elected as independents at the 1891 election because they did not support the government of Sir Henry Parkes. The Free Trade Party lost 27 seats at the election and lost its majority. Reid re-joined the Free Trade Party, replacing Parkes as leader.

The 1894 election saw the Free Trade Party gain 6 seats while the Protectionists lost 15 and a split in Labour saw the party lose 20 seats. No party had a majority, with 23 independents. Dibbs said he would not resign, wanting to test his support in parliament, however the Governor Robert Duff forced his hand, with Dibbs resigning on 2 August 1894. The appointment of Joseph Cook was controversial, with Cook being the leader of the Labour parliamentarians who refused to sign a "pledge" to be bound by decisions of the Caucus, and Cook contested the 1894 election as an  Labour candidate. Cook's decision to join the Reid ministry was seen as an opportunistic act and Cook was labeled as a class traitor.

Under the constitution, ministers in the Legislative Assembly were required to resign to recontest their seats in an election when appointed. Such ministerial by-elections were usually uncontested and on this occasion a by-election was required in Bathurst (Sydney Smith), Hartley (Joseph Cook), Singleton (Albert Gould) and Sydney-King (George Reid) however all were comfortably re-elected. The other four ministers were re-elected unopposed.

The Free Trade Party gained 8 seats at the 1895 election, largely a result of independent members joining the party and they were still 5 seats short of a majority. The party lost 13 seats at the 1898 election, including ministers Jacob Garrard, Albert Gould and Sydney Smith, mostly to the Protectionist Party which contested the election under the name "National Federal Party", reflecting the party's focus on Federation. The ministry's first re-shuffle occurred in August 1898 as a result of that election, with James Hogue, Charles Lee and Varney Parkes appointed to the ministry. Glebe (James Hogue) was the only electorate in which the by-election was contested. Jack Want resigned as Attorney General in April 1898 as a result of Reid's famous Yes-No speech in order to oppose federation, rejoining in June 1898 after the first referendum was defeated. Want resigned again in April 1899 and Reid was appointed Attorney General, initially in addition to his role as Colonial Treasurer, before relinquishing that role in the second re-shuffle in July 1899. The Reid ministry managed to hold on as a minority government until 13 September 1899, when Reid resigned in order to focus on ensuring adequate provisions were made for New South Wales in the federation of the Australian colonies into a Commonwealth.

Composition of ministry

See also

Notes

References

 

New South Wales ministries
1894 establishments in Australia
1899 disestablishments in Australia